The Soviet national ice hockey team was the national men's ice hockey team of the Soviet Union. From 1954, the team won at least one medal each year at either the Ice Hockey World Championships or the Olympic hockey tournament.

After its dissolution in 1991, the Soviet team competed as the CIS team (part of the Unified Team) at the 1992 Winter Olympics. After the Olympics, the CIS team ceased to exist and was replaced by Russia at the 1992 World Championship. Other former Soviet republics (Belarus, Estonia, Kazakhstan, Latvia, Lithuania and Ukraine) also established their own national teams later that year. The International Ice Hockey Federation (IIHF) recognized the Ice Hockey Federation of Russia as the successor to the Soviet Union hockey federation and passed its ranking on to Russia. The other national hockey teams were considered new and sent to compete in Pool C.

The IIHF Centennial All-Star Team included four Soviet-Russian players out of a team of six: goalie Vladislav Tretiak, defenseman Vyacheslav Fetisov and forwards Valeri Kharlamov and Sergei Makarov who played for the Soviet teams in the 1970s and the 1980s were selected for the team in 2008.

History

Ice hockey was not properly introduced into the Soviet Union until the 1940s, though bandy, a similar game played on a larger ice field, had long been popular in the country. It was during a tour of FC Dynamo Moscow of the United Kingdom in 1945 that Soviet officials first got the idea of establishing an ice hockey program. They watched several exhibition matches in London, and National Hockey League President Clarence Campbell would later say that "This was the time when the Russians got the idea for their hockey team. The Russian soccer players were more interested in watching Canadian players play hockey than in soccer." The Soviet Championship League was established in 1946, and the national team was formed shortly after, playing their first matches in a series of exhibitions against LTC Praha in 1948.

The Soviets planned to send a team to the 1953 World Championships, but due to an injury to Vsevolod Bobrov, one of their star players, officials decided against going. They would make their debut at the 1954 World Championships instead. Largely unknown to the larger hockey world, the team surprised many by winning the gold medal, defeating Canada in the final game.

The Soviets played their first exhibition tour in Canada in 1957, which perpetuated a rivalry between the countries. Throughout the rest of the 1950s the World Championships were largely contested between Canada and the Soviet Union. That changed in the early 1960s. Canada won the gold in 1961, and after missing the 1962 tournament due to political issues, the Soviets would win the gold medal every year until 1972. They faced perhaps their greatest upset at the 1976 World Championships; in their opening match against host Poland, the Soviets were defeated 6–4.

In 1972 the Soviets played Canada in an exhibition series that saw the Soviet national team play a team composed of National Hockey League (NHL) players for the first time. Both the Olympics and World Championships did not allow professionals, so the best Canadian players were never able to compete against the Soviets, and in protest at this Canada had left international hockey in 1970. This series, known as the Summit Series, was a chance to see how the NHL players would fare. In eight games (four in Canada, four in the USSR), the teams were close, and it took until the final 34 seconds of the eighth game for Canada to win the series, four games to three, with one tie.

At the 1980 Winter Olympics, the Soviets also had one of their most notable losses. Playing the United States in the medal round, the Soviets lost 4–3. This match, later dubbed the Miracle on Ice, was notable because it had the Soviets, recognized as the top international team in the world, against an American team composed largely of university-level players. The Americans would go on to win the gold medal in the tournament, while the Soviets finished with the silver, only the second time they failed to win gold at the Olympics since their debut in 1956.

The reforms of the 1980s in the Soviet Union had a detrimental effect on the national team. No longer afraid to speak out against their treatment, players like Viacheslav Fetisov and Igor Larionov openly critiqued the management style of their coach, Viktor Tikhonov, which included being secluded in a military-style barracks for eleven months of the year. They also sought the chance to move to North America and play in the NHL, though the authorities were reluctant to allow this. Negotiations with the NHL began in the late 1980s over this, and in 1989 several players, including both Fetisov and Larionov, were permitted to leave the Soviet Union and join NHL teams.

Yuri Korolev was head of the research group for the national men's team from 1964 to 1992, and contributed to the team winning seventeen Ice Hockey World Championships and seven Winter Olympic Games gold medals.

Soviet journalist Vsevolod Kukushkin traveled with the national team as both a reporter and an English to Russian translator. He had access to the team's locker room and the opportunity to speak directly with the players and be part of their daily life. In his 2016 book The Red Machine, Kukushkin reported that the nickname for the Soviet national team came into usage during the 1983 Super Series, when a headline in a Minneapolis newspaper headline read "The Red Machine rolled down on us".

Statistics
Leading scorers (Olympics, World Championships, Canada Cups, 1972 Summit Series)
Sergei Makarov – 248 points
Aleksandr Maltsev – 213+ points
Valeri Kharlamov – 199 points
Boris Mikhailov – 180 points
Vladimir Petrov – 176 points

Tournament record

Olympic Games

World Championship

Summit Series
 1972 – Lost to Canada
 1974 – Won series against Canada

Canada Cup
 
 1976 – Finished in 3rd place
 1981 – Won championship
 1984 – Lost semifinal
 1987 – Lost final
 1991 – Finished in 5th place

Challenge Cup and Rendez-vous vs. NHL All-Stars
 1979 – Won series
 1987 – Tied series

Other tournaments
Deutschland Cup:  Gold medal (1988, 1991)
Nissan Cup:  Gold medal (1990)

Team

Notable players

Yevgeny Babich
Helmuts Balderis
Vsevolod Bobrov
Vyacheslav Bykov
Vitaly Davydov
Vyacheslav Fetisov
Anatoli Firsov
Valeri Kamensky
Sergei Kapustin
Alexei Kasatonov
Valeri Kharlamov
Vladimir Krutov
Alfred Kuchevsky
Igor Larionov
Sergei Makarov
Alexander Maltsev
Boris Mikhailov
Vladimir Petrov
Alexander Ragulin
Vyacheslav Starshinov
Vladislav Tretiak
Valeri Vasiliev
Alexander Yakushev
Yevgeni Zimin
Viktor Zinger

Amateur status of players
Until 1977, professional players were not able to participate in the World Championship, and it was not until 1988 that they could play in the Winter Olympics. However, the Soviet team was populated with amateur players who were primarily full-time athletes hired as regular workers of a company (aircraft industry, food workers, tractor industry) or organization (KGB, Red Army, Soviet Air Force) that sponsored what would be presented as an after-hours social sports society hockey team for their workers in order to keep their amateur status. By the 1970s, several national hockey federations, such as Canada, protested the use of the amateur status for players of Eastern Bloc teams and even withdrew from the 1972 and 1976 Winter Games in protest.

Coaching history

See also
Russia national ice hockey team
CIS national ice hockey team

Notes

References

Bibliography

External links

 Hockey CCCP International
 Soviet Union national ice hockey team 
 1972 Summit Series.com
 Canada Versus the Soviet Union (1972–1987)
 The Hockey Almanac

 
Former national ice hockey teams
National